Uldario Molina Jr., popularly known by his stage name Negi, is a Filipino stand-up comedian, and actor. He is currently seen on Gandang Gabi, Vice! as Vice Ganda's side kick and a hiatus of the show. He appeared in various TV Shows of ABS-CBN like Minute to Win It and movies such as Super Parental Guardians, Finally Found Someone and Wander Bra.

Filmography

Film
Sisterakas (2012) - Snow White
Super Parental Guardians (2016) - Clumsy Binay
Finally Found Someone (2017) - Alfaro
Wander Bra (2018) - Talent show host
Familia Blondina (2019) - Brando
Ayuda Babes (2021) - Alma

Television
Gandang Gabi, Vice! (ABS-CBN, 2011-2020) - Vice Ganda's sidekick
Game ng Bayan (ABS-CBN, 2016)
Minute to Win It (ABS-CBN, 2017-2019) - Contestant (2017)/Co-host (2019)
I Can See Your Voice (Kapamilya Channel/A2Z, 2021-2022) - SING-vestigator
PIEnalo Pinoy Games (PIE Channel, 2022-Present) - Co-host

References

Filipino LGBT actors
LGBT male actors
Living people
Filipino male comedians
Star Magic
Year of birth missing (living people)